Cowie Nunatak is a bold bluff-type nunatak,  high, with a cliffed east face, located  west of Detour Nunatak in the upper part of Mackay Glacier, Victoria Land. It was named after James Cowie of the Scott Base drilling project at Cape Roberts.

References 

Nunataks of Victoria Land
Scott Coast